Valle is the administrative centre of Valle municipality in Agder county, Norway. The village is located in the Setesdal valley, along the river Otra.

The village has municipal offices, schools, Valle Church, stores, a bank, hotels, and camping facilities. The local high school specializes in silversmith and goldsmith training as part of the Setesdal Upper Secondary School. This leads students from all over Norway and internationally to come to Valle to train to become jewelers.

References

Villages in Agder
Valle, Norway